Mont Owl's Head is a mountain in Potton, Quebec, in the Eastern Townships of Quebec, Canada.

A ski area, with the same name, was developed on it by Fred Korman and opened in 1965 with 3 lifts (2 chairlifts and 1 t-bar) and 6 runs.

See also
 List of ski areas and resorts in Canada

References

External links

Ski areas and resorts in Quebec
Landforms of Estrie
Tourist attractions in Estrie